Linacre Road railway station was a station located on the North Mersey Branch in Litherland, Lancashire.

History
It opened on 1 June 1906 and closed on 2 April 1951. The singled track is still in place, although no longer electrified and in a state of dereliction.

Since the 1970s there have been plans to re-electrify the North Mersey Branch and reintroduce a passenger service. As part of those plans Linacre Road station would reopen.

References

External links
Linacre Road railway station at Disused Stations

Disused railway stations in the Metropolitan Borough of Sefton
Former Lancashire and Yorkshire Railway stations
Railway stations in Great Britain opened in 1906
Railway stations in Great Britain closed in 1951